Md. Motiur Rahman is a Jatiya Party (Ershad) politician and a former Jatiya Sangsad Member representing the Kurigram-3 constituency during 2001–2006.

References

Living people
Jatiya Party politicians
8th Jatiya Sangsad members
Year of birth missing (living people)
Place of birth missing (living people)